Halloween Party is the first album by American experimental music act Pink Anvil, released in 2003 by Ipecac Recordings.

Track listing
All tracks written by Pink Anvil.

 "Beginning" – 2:16
 "Rubber Suit" – 4:01
 "'Cause I Told You So" – 4:40
 "Desert" – 6:30
 "Adagio in Cb" – 3:57
 "Downer" – 4:36
 "Rubber Suit, Pt. 2" – 4:00
 "Sugarwater" – 5:23
 "Unmerry" – 3:10
 "Near Death" – 4:54
 "Ending" – 2:29

References

Pink Anvil albums
2003 albums
Ipecac Recordings albums